Front of National Unity or National Unity Front (FJN) was a popular front supervising elections in the Polish People's Republic which also acted as a coalition for the dominant communist Polish United Workers' Party (PZPR) and its allies. It was founded in 1952 as National Front (Front Narodowy) and renamed to Front of National Unity in 1956. It was the heir of the Democratic Bloc (Blok Demokratyczny) which ran in the elections of 1947 before the merger between communists and socialists.

The Front was created by and was subordinate to the PZPR. Its membership included all three legal Polish political parties (the PZPR, Democratic Party, and United People's Party) and many organizations (such as trade unions). During elections it had a near monopoly (varied depending on particular time) on registering candidates who had the right to participate in the elections.  As was the case with other popular fronts in the Soviet bloc, the member parties of the Front were largely subservient to the PZPR; they had to accept the PZPR's "leading role" as a condition of their existence.

In 1983 it was disbanded, to be replaced by the Patriotic Movement for National Rebirth (Patriotyczny Ruch Odrodzenia Narodowego, PRON).

Leaders  
 Bolesław Bierut (1947-1956)
 Aleksander Zawadzki (1956-1964)
 Edward Ochab (1965-1968)
 Janusz Groszkowski (1971-1976)
 Henryk Jabłoński (1976-1983)

Electoral history

Sejm elections

References 

1947 establishments in Poland
Political parties established in 1947
1983 disestablishments in Poland
Political parties disestablished in 1983
Defunct political party alliances in Poland
Popular fronts of communist states
Polish United Workers' Party
Socialist organisations in Poland